Alfred Edward Santangelo (June 4, 1912 – March 30, 1978) was an American lawyer and politician from New York. From 1957 to 1963, he served three terms in the U.S. House of Representatives.

Life
Santangelo was born on June 4, 1912, in New York City. He graduated from Curtis High School, Staten Island. He graduated from City College of New York where he joined Alpha Phi Delta in 1935, and Columbia Law School in 1938.

Political career 
He was a member of the New York State Senate (22nd D.) from 1947 to 1950, sitting in the 166th and 167th New York State Legislatures. In 1950, he ran for re-election, but was defeated by Republican William J. Bianchi.

Santangelo was again a member of the State Senate from 1953 to 1956, sitting in the 169th and 170th New York State Legislatures.

Congress 
He was elected as a Democrat to the 85th, 86th and 87th United States Congresses, holding office from January 3, 1957, to January 3, 1963. After redistricting, due to the 1960 Census, Santangelo ran in November 1962 for re-election in New York's 24th congressional district, but was defeated by Republican Paul A. Fino.

Death and burial 
He died on March 30, 1978, in Orlando, Florida and is buried in Calvary Cemetery and Mausoleum in Woodside, Queens County, New York.

Sources

External links

1912 births
1978 deaths
American Roman Catholics
Burials at Calvary Cemetery (Queens)
Democratic Party New York (state) state senators
Democratic Party members of the United States House of Representatives from New York (state)
Curtis High School alumni
20th-century American politicians